Ri Kyong-song (born 6 November 1997) is a Korean handball player for the Korean national team.

He represented Korea at the 2019 World Men's Handball Championship.

References

1997 births
Living people
Korean male handball players